Brian Desfountain (born 19 June 1948) is a South African cricketer. He played in three first-class matches for Eastern Province in 1977/78.

See also
 List of Eastern Province representative cricketers

References

External links
 

1948 births
Living people
South African cricketers
Eastern Province cricketers
Cricketers from Port Elizabeth